Anailbunia, also known as Analbunia, is a village located in Kathalia Upazila, Jhalokati District in Bangladesh's southern-central Barisal Division. The total population of Anailbunia is 2489, with 1207 being men and 1279 being women.

History
In late 2020, the village gained repute with the success of Bangabandhu National Youth Award recipient Musammat Shirin Sultana in her multipurpose 6 bigha agro-farm project and training in youth development.

Administration
Anailbunia is divided into North Anailbunia and South Anailbunia, with the former forming the 4th ward of the Kathalia Union and the latter forming the 5th ward of the same Union Parishad. The ward councillors are Muhammad Ayyub Ali Mridha and MSc Muhammad Ruhul Amin respectively.

Facilities
The village is home to the Anailbunia Government Primary School, whose headteacher is Abdus Salam. Mosammat Tanya Sharmin is the principal of the South Anailbunia Community School. The Battala Bazar and Chander Hat Bazar are the two haat bazaars of Anailbunia. There are thirteen mosques in the village, to cater for the Muslim-majority inhabitants:

References

External links
Satellite map at Maplandia.com

Populated places in Jhalokati District